Bob Gliner (born  1940s) is an independent documentary filmmaker and Emeritus Faculty of Sociology at San Jose State University. Gliner's work focuses on social change throughout the world and covers such topics as the challenges facing developing nations, school reform, consumerism, climate change, college athletics, the military–industrial complex and the disabled. Gliner's programs air on PBS stations nationwide.  Gliner lives in the Santa Cruz Mountains, in California.

Awards
2008 Bronze Remi. WorldFest International Independent Film Festival. Democracy Left Behind.
2005 Cine Golden Eagle. Playing for Keeps
2005 Worldfest Gold Jury Special Award, Heifer
2004 Columbus International Film & Video Festival, Bronze Plaque, Education For What? Learning Social Responsibility
1994 Cine Golden Eagle, Vietnam: At the Crossroads
1989 National Educational Film & Video Festival, Silver Apple Award, Defending America: The Price We Pay
1989 National Educational Film & Video Festival, Golden Apple Award. Russia Off The Record

References

External links
Bob Gliner Official website

1940s births
Living people
American sociologists
San Jose State University faculty